Madhumasam was an Indian Telugu language soap opera directed by Jayaprasad K aired on Gemini TV from 2 September 2019 to 27 March 2020 every Monday to Saturday at 7.30PM IST. The serial starred Swetha Khelge, Suraj Lokre as main protagonists and Vyshnavi, Lakshmi, Haritha in pivotal roles.

Plot
The story revolves around the girl Shravya (Swetha Khelge), who is leading an independent life on her own terms. She has a traumatic past as her dad married another woman. On the other hand her step mother Annapoorna devi (Haritha) is so loving and caring towards Shravya as she promised to Shravya's biological mother. Shravya has issues with her step mother and she misunderstood her parents as she is unaware of past and promise between her mother and   step mother. She behaves very rude with her parents. But she agreed to marry on the condition of getting separated with parents. She came to know about her stepmom's love and the past because of her aunt at her marriage venue. Unexpectedly her parents died in an accident on the same day and she became the custodian to her two sisters and brother. Now how Shravya become a mother overnight and how she will handle the responsibilities. What Will she choose in life love or responsibility? is the main crux of the story.

Cast
Swetha Khelge as Shravya
Suraj Lokre as Nanda Gopal, he is a gentle man and business partner of Vishwanadh
Vyshnavi as Nithya
Ishika as Satya
Master Rishi as Kireeti (Dumbu)
Manoj as Jayanth
Lakshmi as Bhanumathi, Nanda Gopal's mother
Karate Kalyani as Anjali Devi (Mahesh and Rohan's mother)
Sravan as Rohan
Niharika as Chaitrika, Nandu's sister
Lakshmi Priya (Buchibabu and Achibabu's mother)
Surya Teja as Buchibabu
Vivareddy as Achibabu
Shakuntala as Subbu
Sathwik as Arjun, CBI Officer
Anjali as Lavanya
Padmavathi as Satyavathi, Shravya's aunt

Former cast
Haritha as Annapoorna devi (Nithya Satya and Dumbu's mother, Shravya's foster mother)
Sri charan as Viswanadh (Shravya, Nithya, Satya and Dumbu's father)
Manasa Harika as Satya (replaced by Ishika)
Ashmita Karnani as Bhanumathi, Nanda Gopal's mother (replaced by Lakshmi)
Dinil Rahul as Mahesh, Nitya's friend
Sravanthi as Vasundhara, Shravya's biological mother (Cameo appearance)
Baby krithika as Shravya at childhood (Cameo appearance)

References

Indian television soap operas
Telugu-language television shows
2019 Indian television series debuts
Gemini TV original programming